Robert Donald Burns (born April 5, 1968) is an American professional golfer who has played on the PGA Tour and the Nationwide Tour.

Burns was born in Mission Hills, California. Burns went to John F. Kennedy High school located in the San Fernando Valley. He attended college at Cal State Northridge and was a member of the golf team. He won All-American honors his junior year, and was the individual medalist at the 1990 NCAA Division II Championship. He turned pro in 1991 and joined the PGA Tour in 1994.

During Burns' first month on the PGA Tour, his home in Northridge, California was rocked by the destructive 1994 Northridge earthquake. He ended his rookie season 101st on the money list but failed to qualify for the PGA Tour for 1995 by a single stroke, and spent the next two years on the Nike Tour (now Nationwide Tour). His career hit a low-point in 1997 when he failed to qualify for either tour. In 1998, his fortunes improved dramatically when he won two tournaments and finished first on the Nike Tour money list with $178,664 in earnings.

Burns regained his PGA Tour card for the following season and continued to improve his game. In 2002, he won once and earned over a million dollars in a single season for the first time in his career. His career took another downturn, however, and he was back on the Nationwide Tour in 2005 after failing to qualify by a single shot.

Professional wins (4)

PGA Tour wins (1)

Nike Tour wins (2)

Nike Tour playoff record (0–1)

Other wins (1)
1997 Long Beach Open

Results in major championships

Note: Burns never played in the Masters Tournament or The Open Championship

CUT = missed the half-way cut
"T" = tied

Results in The Players Championship

CUT = missed the halfway cut
"T" indicates a tie for a place

Results in World Golf Championships

"T" = Tied

See also
1993 PGA Tour Qualifying School graduates
1998 Nike Tour graduates
1999 PGA Tour Qualifying School graduates
2001 PGA Tour Qualifying School graduates

References

External links

American male golfers
PGA Tour golfers
Korn Ferry Tour graduates
Golfers from California
California State University, Northridge alumni
People from Mission Hills, Santa Barbara County, California
1968 births
Living people